Zamboanga City, officially the City of Zamboanga (Chavacano and , Tausug: Dāira sin Sambuangan), is a 1st class highly urbanized city in the Zamboanga Peninsula region of the Philippines. According to the 2020 census, it has a population of 977,234 people. It is the fifth-most populous and third-largest city by land area in the Philippines. It is the commercial and industrial center of the Zamboanga Peninsula Region.

On October 12, 1936, Zamboanga became a chartered city under Commonwealth Act No. 39. It was inaugurated on February 26, 1937.

Zamboanga City is an independent, chartered city and was designated highly urbanized on November 22, 1983.

Although geographically separated, and an independent and chartered city, Zamboanga City is grouped with the province of Zamboanga del Sur for statistical purposes, yet governed independently from it.

History

Rajahnate of Sanmalan

The Zamboanga Peninsula was settled in the late 12th or early 13th century by the Subanen people; it was also the homelands of the ancestors of the Yakan, the Balanguingui, and other closely related Sama-Bajau peoples.

The 11th-century Chinese Song Dynasty records also mention a polity named "Sanmalan" (三麻蘭) from Mindanao, which has a name similar to Zamboanga and has been tentatively identified with it by some authors (Wang, 2008; Huang, 1980). Sanmalan is said to be led by a Rajah "Chülan". His ambassador "Ali Bakti" and that of Butuan's "Likan-hsieh" is recorded to have visited the Chinese imperial court with gifts and trade goods in AD 1011. However, the correlation between Zamboanga and Sanmalan is based only on their similar-sounding names. Sanmalan is only mentioned in conjunction with Butuan (P'u-tuan) and it is unknown if Sanmalan is indeed Zamboanga. The historian William Henry Scott (1989) also posits the possibility that Sanmalan instead referred to a polity of the Sama-Bajau ("Samal") people.

During the 13th century, the Tausūg people began migrating to the Zamboanga Peninsula and the Sulu Archipelago from their homelands in northeastern Mindanao. They became the dominant ethnic group in the archipelago after they were Islamized in the 14th century and established the Sultanate of Sulu in the 15th century. A majority of the Yakan, the Balanguingui, and the Sama-Bajau were also Islamized, though most of the Subanen remained animist (with the exception of the Kolibugan subgroup in southwestern Zamboanga).

In colonial-era historical records, the city was previously known as Samboangan. Samboangan is a Sinama term for "mooring place" (also spelled sambuangan; and in Subanen, sembwangan), from the root word samboang ("mooring pole"). The name was later Hispanicized as Zamboanga.

This is commonly contested by folk etymologies which instead attribute the name to the Indonesian word jambangan (claimed to mean "place of flowers", but actually means "pot" or "bowl"), usually with claims that all ethnic groups in Zamboanga were "Malays". However, this name has never been attested in any historical records prior to the 1960s. The city's nickname "City of Flowers" is derived from such folk etymologies.

Spanish rule

Spanish explorers, led by Ferdinand Magellan, arrived in the Philippine archipelago in 1521. Zamboanga was chosen in 1569 as the site of the Spanish settlement and garrison on La Caldera (now part of Barangay Recodo). Spain granted the former Rajahnate of Sanmalan protectorate status against the Sulu Sultanate, its former overlord and the kingdom's name was hispanized into Zamboanga and made a city. Zamboanga City was one of the main strongholds in Mindanao, supporting colonizing efforts in the south of the island and making way for Christian settlements. It also served as a military outpost, protecting the island against foreign invaders and Moro pirates.

In 1599, the Zamboanga fort was closed and transferred to Cebú due to great concerns about attack by the English on that island, which did not occur. After having abandoned the city, the Spaniards as well as some Spanish-American soldiers from Peru and New Spain (Mexico), joined forces with troops from Pampanga and Visayan soldiers (from Bohol, Cebu and Iloilo) and reached the shore of Zamboanga to bring peace to the island against Moro pirates.

In 1635, Spanish officers and soldiers, along with Visayan laborers, settled in the area and construction began on Fort San José (what is now known as Fort Pilar) to protect the inhabitants of the area from piracy by the Moro.

Zamboanga became the main headquarters of the Spaniards on June 23, 1635, upon approval of King Philip IV of Spain, and the Spanish officially founded the city. Thousands of Spanish troops, headed by a governor general from Spain, took the approval to build the first Zamboanga fortress (now called Fort Pilar) in Zamboanga to forestall enemies in Mindanao like Moro pirates and other foreign invaders. There were also a hundred Spanish troops sent to fortify the nearby Presidio of Iligan. The Zamboanga fortress became the main focus of a number of battles between Moros and Spaniards during Spanish rule in the region from the 16th century to the 18th. Spain was forced to abandon Zamboanga temporarily and withdraw its soldiers to Manila in 1662 after the Chinese under Koxinga threatened to invade the Spanish Philippines.

The Spanish returned to Zamboanga in 1718 and rebuilding of the fort began the following year. The fort would serve as defence for the Christian settlement against Moro pirates and foreign invaders for the coming years. There was deportation of mostly Spanish-American and Spanish vagrants from Manila to Zamboanga which helped advance a colonizing program against the Muslim south, further illustrating how the resistance to Spanish sovereignty in Mindanao and Borneo determined imperial policies on the islands.

While the region was already dominated by Catholicism, Muslims kept up a protracted struggle into the 18th century against the ruling Spaniards. A British naval squadron conducted a raid on Zamboanga in January 1798, but was driven off by the city's defensive fortifications. During 1821, the Uruguayan, Juan Fermín de San Martín, brother of the leader of the Argentinian Revolution, José de San Martín, was commander of the fortress-city of Zamboanga for a year. At 1823, inspired by the Spanish-American Wars of Independence, the Spanish-Americans who had been sent to Zamboanga and Philippines as soldiers, joined in the revolt of Andres Novales, and he fought for sovereignty and became the short lived Emperor of the Philippines. In 1831, the custom house in Zamboanga was established as a port, and it became the main port for direct communication, trading some goods and other services to most of Europe, Southeast Asia and Latin America. The American invaders arrived in the Philippines during the time of Spanish Governor General Valeriano Weyler, with thousands of troops to defeat the Spaniards who ruled for over three centuries.

The Spanish government sent more than 80,000 Spanish troops to the Philippines. The Spanish government completely surrendered the islands to the United States in the 1890s.

Establishing its own Republic

The Republic of Zamboanga was established directly on May 28, 1899, after the Zamboangueño revolutionary forces defeated the last Spanish government in Zamboanga. Fort Pilar was turned over to General Vicente Álvarez, who between May and November 1899 was the first president of the República de Zamboanga. This republic continued to exist until 1903, with Isidoro Midel as its second president under a puppet government of the United States; he was succeeded by Mariano Arquiza.

American occupation

Upon the firm establishment of American colonization and dissolution of the Republic in 1903, Zamboanga, as a municipality, was designated as the capital of the Moro Province, a semi-military government consisting of five districts: Zamboanga, Cotabato, Davao, Lanao and Sulu. it established itself the center of commerce, trade, and government of Mindanao Island. During this period, Zamboanga hosted a number of American regional governors, including General John J. Pershing, who was military commander/governor of the Moro Province from 1909 to 1914.

In 1920, Zamboanga City ceased to be capital of the Moro Province when the department was divided into provinces in which the city became under the large province of Zamboanga. This encompasses the present-day Zamboanga Peninsula with the inclusion of the whole province of Basilan.

Commonwealth era and city charter 

When the Commonwealth government was established in 1935, calls to convert the municipality of Zamboanga into a city increased. On September 23, 1936, through Assemblyman Juan Alano, the National Assembly of the Philippines passed Commonwealth Act No. 39 making Zamboanga a chartered city consisting of "the present territorial jurisdiction of the municipality of Zamboanga, the municipality of Bolong, the municipal district of Taluksangay, the whole island of Basilan and the adjacent islands, i.e., the municipality of Isabela, the municipal district of Lamitan, and the municipal district of Maluso." It was later signed by President Manuel Quezon on October 12, 1936. The charter made Zamboanga City as the largest city in the world in terms of land area. During these times, Zamboanga was the leading commercial and industrial city of Mindanao.

Before World War II, Pettit Barracks, a part of the U.S. Army's 43d Infantry Regiment (PS), was stationed there.

World War II
When the Japanese invaded the Philippines, they were headed by Vice Admiral Rokuzo Sugiyama, accompanied by Rear Admiral Naosaburo Irifune. The Japanese landed at Zamboanga City on March 2, 1942.

The Japanese government in the city was overthrown by American and Filipino forces following a fierce battle on March 10–12, 1945. The rebuilt general headquarters of the Philippine Commonwealth Army and Philippine Constabulary was stationed in Zamboanga City from March 13, 1945, to June 30, 1946, during the military operations in Mindanao and Sulu against the Japanese.

Contemporary history

After World War II 
After the war, citizens on the island of Basilan found it difficult to appear in courts, pay their taxes, or seek help from the mayor and other officials. Going from Basilan to the mainland required three or more hours of ferry travel. To fix the problem, Representative Juan Alano filed a bill in Congress to separate Basilan from Zamboanga City. The island of Basilan was proclaimed a separate city through Republic Act No. 288 on July 16, 1948.

On April 7, 1953, by virtue of Republic Act No. 840, the city was classified as first-class city according to its revenue.

On April 29, 1955, a special law changed the landscape of the city government when Republic Act No. 1210 amended the City Charter that made elective the position of city mayor and the creation of an elective vice mayor and eight elective city councilors. The vice mayor is the presiding-officer of the City Council. In November 1955, Liberal Party candidate Cesar Climaco with his running-mate, Tomas Ferrer won the first local elections. They were inducted into office on January 1, 1956, as determined by the Revised Election Code.

Martial law years 
On September 21, 1972, President Ferdinand Marcos signed Proclamation No. 1081 placing the Philippines under martial law. Zamboanga City's local government came under presidential control for the first time since 1955. Marcos extended Enriquez's term when his tenure was about to end in 1975.

President Marcos reorganized the local government on November 14, 1975, and the city council was replaced by a Sangguniang Panlungsod with the mayor as its new presiding officer and its members included the vice mayor, the chairman of the Katipunan ng mga Kabataang Barangay, the president of the Association of Barangay Captains, and sectoral representatives of agriculture, business and labor.

When Mayor Enriquez resigned and bid for the newly created Interim Batasang Pambansa in 1978, Vice Mayor Jose Vicente Atilano II was appointed by President Marcos to replace him.

Climaco's return (1980–1984) 
In 1980, Cesar Climaco staged his political comeback when he was elected again to the mayoral post under his new party, the Concerned Citizen's Aggregation. He had gone into exile to the United States in protest against Marcos' declaration of martial law.

In the 1984 Philippine parliamentary election, Climaco was elected a member of the Regular Batasang Pambansa. However, he declined to assume his seat until he had completed his six-year term as mayor in his consistent protest against Marcos. Climaco's protest against the dictator earned Zamboanga City the distinction of 'the beacon of democracy in Mindanao'.

21st century
On November 19, 2001, the Cabatangan Government Complex in Barangay Cabatangan, the seat of the Autonomous Region in Muslim Mindanao, was raided by former MNLF fighters in protest of Misuari's ouster as Governor of the autonomous region in which they took residents hostage. The complex also houses the different regional government offices such as the Commission on Audit, Population Commission, Civil Service Commission, Area Vocational Rehabilitation Center, DECS Training Center and the Zamboanga Arturo Eustaquio College Department of Criminology. An air strike by the military began on November 27 in which the hostages were later released after the government agreed to escort the rebels to a safe zone in Panubigan where they were allowed to go free.

In 2013, Maria Isabelle Climaco Salazar, niece of former Mayor Cesar Climaco, was elected the second woman mayor of the city.

Zamboanga City crisis

On September 9, 2013, a faction of the Moro National Liberation Front (MNLF) under the leadership of Nur Misuari seized hostages in Zamboanga City and attempted to raise the flag of the self-proclaimed Bangsamoro Republik, a state which declared its independence earlier in August, in Talipao, Sulu. This armed incursion has been met by the Armed Forces of the Philippines, which seeks to free the hostages and expel the MNLF from Zamboanga City. The standoff degenerated into urban warfare, and brought parts of the city under standstill for days.

Mayor Climaco-Salazar and her administration are relocating the internal displaced persons (IDPs) affected by the crisis to transitory sites and later, permanent housings in various places around Zamboanga City. Her rehabilitation plan, "Zamboanga City Roadmap to Recovery and Rehabilitation (Z3R)", envisions building back a better Zamboanga City and rehabilitating the areas affected by the crisis.

Geography

Geology

The southwest and eastern sides of Zamboanga City are bounded by irregular coastlines with generally rocky terrain and occasional stretches of sandy or gravelly beaches. The coastal profile usually descends abruptly towards the sea. Where rivers enter the sea, bays have formed, and the surrounding area has filled up with alluvial soils, producing small to large coastal plains.

Topography
The overall topography of the city could be described as rolling to very steep. There are some flat lands, mostly narrow strips along the east coast. The urban center is mostly flat with a gentle slope to the interior, ranging from 0% to 3%. A portion, about 38,000 hectares, has slopes ranging from 18% to 30%. Another 26,000 hectares has slopes of less than 3%, while about 37% of the area (52,000 hectares) has slopes ranging from 30% to more than 50%. The highest registered elevation is 1,200 metres.

The territorial jurisdiction of the city includes the islands of big and small Santa Cruz, Tictabon, Sacol, Manalipa, Tumalutap, Vitali, as well as other numerous islands. The total land area of the city is recorded to be 142,067.95 hectares or 1,420.6795 square kilometers and with contested land area of 3,259.07 hectares between the boundary of Limpapa and Zamboanga del Norte, consolidated of the total land area 145,327.02 hectares or 1,453.2702 Km2 according to the latest cadastral survey of DENR IX year 2015. This does not include the area of about 25 other islands within the territorial jurisdiction of the city – which have an aggregate area of 6,248.5 hectares as verified by the Office of the City Engineer. Putting these all together, the city's new total land area would come to 151,575.52 hectares or 1,515.75. Km2.

Climate

Zamboanga City features a tropical wet and dry climate under the Köppen climate classification (Aw).

Barangays 

The city of Zamboanga is politically subdivided into 98 barangays. These are grouped into two congressional districts, with 38 barangays in the West Coast and 60 barangays in the East Coast.

Demographics

Zamboanga City is the 6th most populous in the Philippines and the 2nd most populous in Mindanao after Davao City. The city's population had an increase of 54,670 over the five years since 2010. It had an annual population growth rate at 1.26%, lower than from in the year 2000 to 2010 which was 2.98%. The city's population is expected to reach 1 million between 2020 and 2025. The City is also called as the primate city of ARMM and Zamboanga regions because of its extensive population, sprawl and economy that is 4x bigger than the second largest city in the two regions which is Cotabato.

Among the city's 98 barangays, Talon-Talon is the most populous with 4.1% share of this city's population, followed by Mampang (4.0%), Tumaga (3.6%), Tetuan (3.5%), Calarian (3.4%), San Roque and Pasonanca (both with 3.2%).

Religion

According to statistics compiled by the Philippine government, the most dominant religion in Zamboanga City is Roman Catholicism, followed by Islam and Evangelical Protestantism.

Other religious practices and denominations in the city were Buddhism, paganism, animism and Sikhism.

Roman Catholicism 

With 60% of the city's population, Roman Catholicism remains the predominant religion in the city. Zamboanga City was the first to establish its own Catholic diocese in Mindanao (now the Roman Catholic Archdiocese of Zamboanga).

The Metropolitan Cathedral of the Immaculate Conception serves as the seat of the Archdiocese of Zamboanga. It was designed by Domingo Abarro III. The first church was located at the front of Plaza Pershing, where the present Universidad de Zamboanga stands. The church was designated a cathedral in 1910 when the diocese of Zamboanga City was created. In 1943, the cathedral was one of the edifices bombarded by Japanese soldiers during World War II. In 1956, the cathedral was relocated beside Ateneo de Zamboanga University, formerly known as the Jardin de Chino, where Chinese farmers grew the city's vegetables.

The titular patroness is Nuestra Señora La Virgen del Pilar de Zaragoza, and its secondary patron is Pope Pius X.

Islam 
Muslims have also been an integral part of Zamboanga, comprising 35% of the city's population. Some barangays such as Campo Islam are now entirely populated by Muslims, due to migration from people of Sulu who are mostly Tausug. The Yakan, a minority group of Muslim people from Basilan also migrated to the city. These barangays with Muslim majority population, do not celebrate fiestas but do celebrate Hari Raya (the eid celebration).

Other Christian denominations
With the inception of the American era, Protestant sects were introduced. Christian and Missionary Alliance, Philippine Independent Church, Seventh-day Adventist, The Church of Jesus Christ of Latter-day Saints, and United Church of Christ in the Philippines are included. Most Protestants are migrants who are mostly of Cebuano or Ilocano ethnicity. Members of Iglesia ni Cristo live in Zamboanga City and have created several locales.

Ethnicities

The Zamboangueño people (Chavacano/Spanish: Pueblo Zamboangueño) are a creole ethnolinguistic group of people from the Philippines originating from the Zamboanga peninsula, where Zamboanga City is also situated. The ancestors of the present inhabitants of the city are said to also have migrated to other areas in the Southwestern Mindanao. Due to migration, a number of other ethnicities have a visible presence in the city such as the Samal, Yakan, Tausug and Badjao peoples.

As a result of Spanish colonization, according to a genetic study written by Maxmilian Larena et al., published in the Proceedings of the National Academy of Sciences of the United States, the Philippine ethnic groups with the highest amount of Spanish/European descent are the Zamboangueños, with 4 out of 10 Zamboangueños being of Spanish descent, this is followed by Bicolanos, with 2 out of 10 Bicolanos being of Spanish descent. Meanwhile, there is only "some" Spanish descent among the people of the lowland Christianized Filipino ethnic groups.

The Spanish descent is due to Zamboanga city being a historical Spanish fortress reinforced by soldiers from Mexico and Peru.

Language
Zamboangueño is one of six Spanish-based creole language varieties of the Philippines identified by linguists. Zamboangueño, known locally as Chavacano, with Spanish as its lexifier and grammar influenced by other Philippine languages, is the native language of inhabitants living around the city and the nearby island of Basilan. Aside from Chavacano, English is also understood. Tausug is the second-most spoken language in the city after Chavacano, due to significant Tausug migration from the Sulu Archipelago. The Subanen, Yakan, Sama, Cebuano and Hiligaynon languages can also be heard within the city.

Economy

Sardine industry

Zamboanga City is also dubbed as the Sardines Capital of the Philippines, for 11 out of 12 sardines companies in the country are produced here. The canning factories are converged in the west coast of Zamboanga. Sardine fishing and processing account for about 70 percent of the city's economy. Situated at the western tip of the Mindanao mainland, Zamboanga City is a natural docking point for vessels traversing the rich fishing grounds of the Zamboanga Peninsula and the Sulu Archipelago.

The production of canned sardines in this city have upgraded their production to conform to international food safety and quality standards. Companies that produce these goods are looking to enter new markets in Russia and other European countries.

Most sardine fishing fleets and canning factories have located in Zamboanga City due to its proximity to the rich fishing grounds of the Sulu Sea. To date, 26 registered commercial fishing companies operating 87 sardine purse seine fleets and 569 boats of different classifications that are fishing in the Zamboanga and Sulu waters are based in Zamboanga City (BFAR IX 2015).

The 11 canned sardine corporations operating 12 manufacturing plants; four tin can manufacturers; and, 4 ship construction and ship repair companies. The city supplies approximately 85–90% of the country's canned sardine requirements and the canned sardines sector contributes at least US$16 million in annual export earnings to the city

Zamboanga City Special Economic Zone

The Zamboanga City Special Economic Zone Authority and Freeport (ZamboEcoZone), also known as the Zamboanga Freeport Authority (ZFA), was created by virtue of Republic Act 7903 in 1995.

The Special Economic Zone was enacted into law on February 23, 1995, and made operational a year later with the appointment of a chairman and administrator and the members of the Board by former President Fidel V. Ramos. It is located about 23 km from the city proper. It is one of the three current Economic Freeport Zones outside Luzon.

Shopping malls
 Alta Mall was the city's first shopping mall to operate in the city. However, it closed in 1996 and the three-hectare mall complex was deserted.

On December 10, 2015, KCC Malls opened their fourth branch in Zamboanga as KCC Mall de Zamboanga and is currently the second-largest mall in Mindanao in terms of Gross Floor Area.

The country's largest shopping retailer, SM Supermalls bought Mindpro Citimall in 2016 and the mall shall be converted with an SM brand. The mall was opened to the public on December 8, 2020.

Seaweed industry 
Seaweed production plants in Zamboanga City, along with Cebu and Southern Luzon, produce most of the world's supply of carrageenan. Seventy-five percent of the country's eucheuma and kappaphycus seaweed is produced mostly in the Zamboanga Peninsula and the Sulu Archipelago.

International trade
Zamboanga City is a member of East ASEAN Growth Area (BIMP-EAGA), a regional economic cooperation initiative between the several countries in Southeast Asia. As a result of its membership, air and sea routes have been opened between Zamboanga City and Sandakan in Malaysia. The two cities have existing trade relations and have had historical cultural interactions.

Tourism

The Department of Tourism has selected Zamboanga City as a flagship tourism destination in Zamboanga Peninsula. Domestic and foreign tourist arrivals increased 8 percent to 439,160 in 2005, according to data from the regional tourism office. The same report notes that Filipinos accounted for 80 percent of the tourist arrivals. Moreover, 50 percent of those tourists visited the city before.

Zamboanga City's famous Pink Sand Beach of Santa Cruz was recognized by the National Geographic as one of the "World's 21 Best Beaches" in 2018. A surge in tourist arrivals was recorded in 2018 that hit almost 100,000. A day-trip to the island includes a hop to Little Santa Cruz's long white sand bar and a tour of the island's lagoon known for its rich ecosystem.

Another rising tourist hub is the newly opened 11 Islands (commonly called Onçe Islas), a group of islands with white-sand beaches and sand bars located in the city's east coast.

Despite the warnings and seasonal advisories, growth in terms of arrivals tells otherwise. The negative impressions shows no effect on the Tourist's perception of the place in general.

The whole Zamboanga Peninsula Region recorded 723,455 tourist arrivals in 2018 of which 11,190 are foreigners, 10,523 Overseas Filipino Workers (OFWs), and 701,742 were domestic tourists according to the Department of Tourism.

Government

Executive

Zamboanga City is the third oldest city in the Philippines, with a mayor–council form of government.

The city government of Zamboanga was in a commission form shortly between 1912 and 1914 with Christopher Frederick Bader as the appointed mayor.  It then was replaced by a municipal form of government headed by a municipal mayor assisted by a municipal vice-president.

When the City Charter of Zamboanga was signed on October 12, 1936, the municipal government was converted into a city one headed by a mayor appointed by the President of the Philippine Commonwealth.

With the passage of Republic Act No. 1210 on April 29, 1955, the position of mayor became elective and the post of vice mayor was created.

Representation in Congress
Zamboanga City received its own representation for the Philippine Congress in 1984 when the Regular Batasang Pambansa was convened. Previously, the city was part of the representation of the Zamboanga Province from 1935 to 1953, of Zamboanga del Sur from 1953 to 1972 and in Zamboanga Peninsula from 1978 to 1984.

The former lone congressional district was further divided into two separate districts: the West Coast, comprises from the City Proper to Barangay Limpapa is represented by Congressman Khymer Adan Olaso, while in the East Coast, comprises from Barangay Tetuán to Barangay Licomo is represented by Congressman Manuel Jose "Mannix" Dalipe.

The city's population had reached to 774,407 people since 2007. Under Republic Act 9269, Zamboanga City is qualified to have its third district in the House of Representatives. However, in 2008, the formation of Zamboanga City's Third District was then opposed by the local majority block of the city council.

Legislative

The first legislative body of Zamboanga City was established in 1914 composed of councilors who represented the different districts of barrios of then-municipality of Zamboanga.

When the City Charter of Zamboanga was signed on October 12, 1936, the municipal council was replaced by the City Council presided by the mayor and consisted of five councilors, the city treasurer and the city engineer. All members are appointed by the President of the Philippine Commonwealth.

With the passage of Republic Act No. 1210 on April 29, 1955, the position of mayor became elective and the post of vice mayor was created. The council also became elective and its membership was increased to eight presided by the vice mayor.

During the Marcos regime, the city council was renamed to Sangguniang Panglungsod and its membership shuffled. The mayor became the presiding-officer while the vice mayor became a regular member. Other representatives such as the agriculture, business and labor sectoral representatives; chairman of the Kabataan Barangay Federation and the president of the Association of Barangay Captains was added to the council. All members of the council except for the mayor and the vice mayor are all appointed by the President.

After Marcos was deposed, a new Local Government Code was enacted in 1991 and the mayor was restored to the executive branch. The city council organization existed since.

The current local Sangguniang Panglungsod is composed of 19 members:
 the Vice Mayor as its presiding officer elected citywide;
 8 councilors elected from the two legislative districts;
 Chairman of the Liga ng mga Barangay of the city as ex officio member;
 President of the Federasyon ng Federasyon ng Sangguniang Kabataan of the city as ex officio member; and
 Mandatory Representative of the Indigenous Peoples in Zamboanga City as ex officio member.

Judiciary

House Bill 1455 entitled "An Act Amending Sections 14 (J) and 29 of Batas Pambansa Blg. 129, Otherwise Known as The Judiciary Reorganization Act of 1980", calls for the creation of four additional Regional Trial Court branches in the Province of Zamboanga del Sur, and the Cities of Pagadian and Zamboanga City with an overall total of nineteen branches.

Out of the 19 branches, ten seats shall be for Zamboanga City, and the remaining seats for Pagadian City, Molave, San Miguel, Ipil, and Aurora.

Armed forces and law enforcement

Zamboanga City hosts one a large number of military, police and coast guard bases in the country. The Edwin Andrews Air Base hosts the Air Force unit in the city is located at the Zamboanga International Airport complex. The Camp General Basilio Navarro in Upper Calarian, is the main operating base of the Western Mindanao Command (WestMinCom). WesMinCom is one of the unifying commands of the Armed Forces of the Philippines that serves the Western Mindanao. The Coast Guard District Southwestern Mindanao is located near the Camp General Basilio Navarro, while a coast guard station is located inside the Port of Zamboanga.

Transportation

Air

The Zamboanga International Airport is located in Barangay Canelar, and has a 2,610-metre primary runway and can serve international flights and bigger planes such as the C-17 Globemaster III, Antonov An-124, Airbus A330 and Boeing 747. The government has already earmarked more than 240 million pesos to complete the rehabilitation of the existing facilities of the airport, which was ranked the tenth-busiest in the Philippines in 2008.

The city’s new airport is being proposed in Barangays Mercedes and Talabaan, which will replace the existing one in Barangay Canelar.

Land
The primary modes of transportation within the city are serviced by taxis, jeepneys, and tricycles. Regular and air-conditioned buses of the Yanson Group of Bus Companies serve the long-haul routes from Zamboanga City to other areas in Mindanao and in the Visayas. Other smaller bus companies ply the routes to neighboring municipalities in the Zamboanga del Norte and Zamboanga Sibugay areas. Since last June 25, 2018, taxi units was launched with initial 13 units, until additional into 50 units. This 2019, there are 100 taxi units plying around Zamboanga City to any points in Region 9, and the operators says, it will surely adding until reaching maximum of more than 200 taxi units.

Sea

Zamboanga City has nineteen seaports and wharves, twelve of them are privately owned and the rest are owned by the government. This includes some ports of Basilan which are registered as a part of Zamboanga City port management. The biggest and most modern seaport is the government-operated main port in Zamboanga City, which can accommodate 20 ships at any given time. There are 25 shipping companies whose vessels regularly dock at the port of Zamboanga. The city also has fastcraft services to Sandakan, Malaysia, and one shipping cargo company from Vietnam is also serving the routes from and to Zamboanga City to deliver goods from Vietnam.

In 2002, the Port of Zamboanga City, including the area ports of Basilan, registered 5.57 million passenger movement, surpassing Batangas by 1.3 million passengers, and Manila by over 1.59 million passengers.

On May 28, 2009, the PHP700 million port expansion project, funded by the national government was inaugurated by President Gloria Macapagal Arroyo.

Infrastructure

Telecommunication 

Major telecommunications firm, Philippine Long Distance Telephone Company, maintains operations in the city. Mabuhay Satellite Corporation and DITO has set up a facility in Zamboanga City in order to improve existing communications infrastructure.

Power

The Zamboanga City Electric Cooperative is the franchise holder of electric power distribution covering the entire city.

Conrado Alcantara and Sons Holdings (Conal) constructed a coal-fired power plant with an initial capacity of 105 megawatt on a 60-hectare land inside the Zamboanga City Special Economic Zone Authority. The plant was originally to open in 2014, with the constructors expecting to meet the demand of the city's electricity by that year. However, the project was delayed and had begun construction by the end of 2017. The plant is expected to be fully operational by 2020.

Water
Zamboanga City relies heavily on surface water from the Tumaga River for its water supply. The Zamboanga City Water District (ZCWD) is serving only 48% of the total population of the total water production, 38% is accounted water. Given the projected population and the fact that the city is a highly urbanising one, it is likely that future water requirements will not be satisfied unless other sources such as rivers and springs be tapped to augment water supply sources.

ZCWD has 24 production wells. These are located in the following strategic areas within the city that are producing 1,304 m³ daily.

Health

There are several medical centres and hospitals in Zamboanga. The Zamboanga Peninsula Medical Center is the city's newest hospital which was opened in 2015. It is regarded as one of the largest and most modern in the region likened to the St. Luke's Medical Center. The government-operated Zamboanga City Medical Center was founded in 1918 as the Zamboanga City General Hospital. The Brent Hospital and Colleges, Inc. was founded on February 2, 1914, by Charles Henry Brent, the first Protestant Episcopal missionary bishop in the Philippines. Today it operates a school within its compound, offering nursing and allied health courses.

The Zamboanga City Red Cross chapter was established on June 17, 1946, known originally as the Zamboanga City Chapter. The original Zamboanga City Chapter comprised the city of Zamboanga and the three provinces of Basilan, Zamboanga del Norte and Zamboanga del Sur.

West Metro Medical Center is a secondary-level private hospital in Zamboanga City, Philippines. As of 2015, the hospital has a capacity of 110 beds. Ongoing construction of an annex is to increase bed capacity to 190, making it the largest private hospital in the Zamboanga Peninsula and Archipelago.

In 2006, the Military Sealift Command (MSC) hospital ship, USNS Mercy (T-AH-19), anchored off the coast of Zamboanga City, to provide medical, dental and veterinary care for the people of the city.

Sports and recreation facilities
Convention centers that host several events and congregations include the Garden Orchid Hotel's Convention Center, Palacio Del Sur, Centro Latino, Astoria Regency, and Patio Palmeras. KCC Mall de Zamboanga also has its convention halls that is located at its East Wing.

Sport venues in Zamboanga City include the Joaquin F. Enriquez Memorial Sports Complex, the Universidad de Zamboanga Summit Centre, Southern City Colleges Citadel Sports Arena, and the Mayor Vitaliano D. Agan Coliseum.

Education

There exists numerous public and private schools throughout the city. The Western Mindanao State University is state-run. Sectarian schools include the Ateneo de Zamboanga University. There are also a number of foreign schools with study programs. Other universities in the city include the Universidad de Zamboanga, Southern City Colleges, Pilar College, AMA Computer College, Zamboanga Peninsula Polytechnic State University, and Zamboanga State College of Marine Sciences and Technology.

Media

Zamboanga City has 26 radio stations (9 AM & 17 FM). There are also 17 regular television stations and three cable television stations. Several local publications operate in the various parts of the city and nearby provinces and regions, such as The Daily Zamboanga Times, The Mindanao Examiner Regional Newspaper, Voz de Mindanao, Zamboanga Peninsula Journal, Zamboanga Star, Zamboanga Today, The Zamboanga Post, and Zamboanga Forum.

Notable personalities

 Eumir Marcial – Filipino Boxer. Won a bronze medal in the 2020 Summer Olympics, and has 4 Gold Medals in the South East Asian Games
 Mike Tolomia – basketball player
 Roseller T. Lim – the first Zamboangueño who became a Philippine senator from December 30, 1955, to December 30, 1963. Lim was known as the "Great Filibuster", after he filibustered for more than 18 hours in an attempt to prevent the election of Ferdinand Marcos as president of the Senate.
 Alyssa Alano – a Filipina-Australian film and TV actress. She was a former member of the popular Viva Hotbabes franchise.
 Hidilyn Diaz – a Filipina weightlifter and airwoman. She won the silver medal in the 2016 Summer Olympics' women's 53-kg weight division. In Tokyo on July 26, 2021, Diaz won the Philippines' first Olympic gold medal at the 2020 Summer Olympics for women's weightlifting and set the Olympic record for the 55 kg category by lifting a total of 224 kg.
 Buddy Zabala – a Filipino musician and producer. He was the bassist of Filipino punk rock band Hilera and also currently of Cambio. He was also a member of Eraserheads and bassist for The Dawn.
 Anton Mari H. Lim – a Filipino veterinarian, businessman, public figure, and humanitarian.
 Andy Mark C. Barroca – a Filipino professional basketball player for the Magnolia Hotshots in the Philippine Basketball Association (PBA).
 Ryan Roose B. "RR" Garcia – a Filipino professional basketball player for the TNT KaTropa in the PBA.
 Rudy Briones Lingganay Jr. – another Filipino professional basketball player for the TNT KaTropa in the PBA.
 Chico Lanete – a Filipino professional basketball player for the Phoenix Fuel Masters in the PBA.
 Jainal Antel Sali Jr. – Filipino Islamic terrorist and leader of Abu Sayyaf, a dangerous Jihadist terrorist group of Asian origin affiliated with the Islamic State.

Sister cities
Zamboanga City is twinned with the following cities:

See also 

Cagayan de Oro
Davao City
General Santos
Cotabato City

References

Sources

External links 

 
 [ Philippine Standard Geographic Code]

 
Cities in Zamboanga Peninsula
Cities in Zamboanga del Sur
Highly urbanized cities in the Philippines
Capitals of former nations
Former provincial capitals of the Philippines
Populated places established in 1635
1635 establishments in the Philippines
Populated coastal places in the Philippines
Port cities and towns in the Philippines
Enclaves and exclaves